David Webb is an English professional football coach who was most recently manager of York City.

After an academy and non league playing career, Webb started coaching in 2002 and has held positions at Crystal Palace, Tottenham Hotspur, Millwall, Southampton, AFC Bournemouth Östersund and Huddersfield Town.

Playing career
Webb was a youth player with Crystal Palace FC . Webb then went on to play non league for four years before pursuing a career in professional football coaching at the age of 22.

Coaching career
In August 2002, Webb was appointed Academy Coach - Scouting Coordinator by Crystal Palace and moved to Tottenham Hotspur as an Academy Coach in June 2005 before joining Millwall as Head of Academy Coaching in June 2007.
In June 2010, he joined Southampton as 15-21 Talent Identification Scout/Coach. In 2013 Webb  joined AFC Bournemouth as Head of First team Recruitment and Analysis before returning to Spurs in May 2015 as Head of Elite Potential Identification and Development .

First team roles
In June 2013 Webb was appointed Head of First team Recruitment and Analysis at AFC Bournemouth. In June 2015 Webb Joined Tottenham Hotspur as Head of Elite Identification and Development. In October 2018, Webb joined Östersund as Technical Director and was appointed Huddersfield Town’s Head of Football Operations, in July 2019, a role he left at the end of the 2020/2021season.

Managerial career
Webb was appointed manager of National League side York City on 2 December 2022 with the role effective from 5 December 2022. On 12 February 2023, Webb parted company with the club.

Personal life
Webb holds a UEFA A Licence.

He gained a Sports Psychology Master's degree from St Mary's University, Twickenham in 2012.

Managerial statistics
 As of matches played at 12th February 2023

References

Living people
Association football coaches
English football managers
York City F.C. managers
National League (English football) managers
1980 births